The Big Game is a high-stakes poker cash game played in the "Bobby's Room", a cardroom named after Bobby Baldwin, at the Bellagio casino in Las Vegas. In 2010, the game partially expanded to "The Ivey Room" at Aria Resort and Casino. The table features no-limit and pot-limit games with wagers up to $100,000 per hand. Limit games as high as $4,000/$8,000 are often played but $800/$1,600 is normal.

Structure
The table features a variety of poker games played in rotation and changing every 8–10 hands.  The games are selected from a list of the players' choices, including:

Texas hold 'em (limit and no limit)
Seven-card stud (straight high, eight or better Hi/Lo, Hi/Lo without qualifiers, limit)
Omaha (straight high, eight or better Hi/Lo, limit and pot limit)
Deuce-to-seven triple draw (limit)
Deuce-to-seven single draw (no limit)
Ace-to-Five triple draw (limit)
Ace-to-Five single draw (no limit)
Razz (limit)

Usual players
Usually players buy in for $200,000–300,000, but anyone with the minimum buy in of $20,000 is welcome to play. In addition to the occasional drop-in player, the following players have been known to play regularly in the Big Game over the years:

Patrik Antonius
David Benyamine
Doyle Brunson
Todd Brunson
Johnny Chan
Allen Cunningham
Tom Dwan
Eli Elezra
Sammy Farha
Ted Forrest
Chau Giang
Barry Greenstein
David Grey
Gus Hansen
Jennifer Harman
John Hennigan
Phil Ivey
Guy Laliberté
Minh Ly
Daniel Negreanu
David Oppenheim
Ralph Perry
Nick Schulman
Huck Seed

Chip Reese was a regular until he died.

References

Poker gameplay and terminology